Zeiraphera unfortunana, the purplestriped shootworm, is a moth of the family Tortricidae. It is found in North America in Nova Scotia, from Ontario to British Columbia, Yukon, Alaska, Michigan and Minnesota.

The larvae feed on Picea glauca, Picea engelmanni, Picea sitchensis, Abies balsamea, Abies lasiocarpa and Abies amabilis.

External links
Image of adult

Olethreutinae
Moths described in 2008
Moths of North America